La Neuveville District was one of three French-speaking districts of the Bernese Jura in the canton of Bern with the seat being La Neuveville, the other two being Courtelary and Moutier. It had a population of about 6,083 in 2004. The three districts were merged on 1 January 2010 to form the new district of Jura Bernois with the capital at Courtelary.

References 

Former districts of the canton of Bern